Johnson "John" Juanda (born July 8, 1971) is an Indonesian professional poker player of Chinese descent based in Tokyo, Japan. He has won five World Series of Poker bracelets.

Personal life
Juanda was born into a Hoklo family in Medan, North Sumatera, Indonesia on July 8, 1971. He was a high school track star for the 200 meter sprints to 5000 meters races. Juanda arrived in the United States in 1990 to enroll at Oklahoma State University. He earned an MBA from Seattle University. 

Juanda is fluent in both Mandarin Chinese and English. He currently resides in Tokyo, Japan.

Poker career
In both 2001 and 2002, he was Card Player Magazine's tournament Player of the Year, winning four World Series of Poker titles, and a World Poker Open Championship title. In November 2004, he won the inaugural Professional Poker Tour event at the Foxwoods Casino in Connecticut.

In November 2005, he earned nearly $500,000 in Monte Carlo, Monaco after winning the Monte Carlo Millions Consolation tournament, finishing sixth in the Monte Carlo Millions Main Event, and finishing second at "The FullTiltPoker.Net Invitational Live from Monte Carlo." In January 2006, Juanda defeated a field including Jeff Lisandro, Mike Sexton, Barry Greenstein, Tony Bloom, Tony G, and Phil Ivey to win the A$1,000,000 ($732,901) first prize in the Crown Australian Poker Championship A$100,000 speed poker event. Juanda won the 2008 World Series of Poker Europe £10,000 No Limit Holdem Main Event, earning £868,800 ($1,580,096). A little over a week later, he finished runner-up to Jason Mercier at the European Poker Tour's London £1 Million Showdown, a non-title no limit holdem event also known as the £20,000 High Roller event, earning £327,000 ($598,770).

Although Juanda has made six World Poker Tour final tables, he has never captured a WPT title. He has finished 2nd (Bellagio Season 1), 3rd (WPT Invitational Season 2), 4th (Mirage Season 3), 5th (twice; Aruba Season 3 and Niagara Falls Season 5), and 6th (Bellagio Season 3) at the six final tables he has appeared at. He has also finished 7th (PartyPoker Cruise Season 2) and 8th (Legends Season 5), just missing two more opportunities at another final table. As of 2014, his total live tournament winnings exceed $16,000,000. Juanda's 54 cashes at the WSOP account for $4,702,392 of his live tournament winnings and place him tied for 8th for all time WSOP cashes.

In 2015, he was selected to be part of the Poker Hall of Fame along with Jennifer Harman.

World Series of Poker bracelets

An "E" following a year denotes bracelet(s) won at the World Series of Poker Europe

References

1971 births
Living people
Indonesian people of Chinese descent
Indonesian emigrants to Japan
Chinese emigrants to Japan
Indonesian poker players
People from Medan
Oklahoma State University alumni
Poker After Dark tournament winners
Seattle University alumni
World Series of Poker bracelet winners
World Series of Poker Europe Main Event winners
European Poker Tour winners
Poker Hall of Fame inductees